Grevillea epicroca is a species of flowering plant in the family Proteaceae and is endemic to south-eastern New South Wales. It is a shrub with elliptic to lance-shaped leaves and red, silky-hairy flowers.

Description

Taxonomy
Grevillea epicroca was first formally described in 2000 by Val Stajsic and Bill Molyneux in the Flora of Australia from specimens collected by Michael Crisp near Braidwood in 1976. The specific epithet (epicroca) means "a transparent woman's garment", referring to the thin layer of hairs on the lower surface of the leaves.

Distribution and habitat

References

epicroca
Flora of New South Wales
Proteales of Australia
Plants described in 2000